International trading tax stamp is kind of revenue stamps that were used in the Soviet Union in the 1920s and 1930s for taxation of the trade in stamps. The latter were considered a commodity for which philatelists could be taxed. This type of taxation was introduced by the Soviet government in addition to revenue it collected from stamp sales. International trading tax stamps were issued by the Posledgol Central Commission of VTsIK, the Organisation of the Commissioner for Philately and Scripophily and, later, by the Soviet Philatelic Association.

Stamp issues 
These were the first two RSFSR stamps designed by Rihards Zariņš and overprinted with surcharges of 250 and 500 rubles, respectively. These newly surcharged stamps did not have postal value and were used as a proof that taxes had been paid on stamps exported from, or imported into, Russia.

This practice was continued under the USSR, and in December 1923, some tsarist  issues were subject to export surcharge made by the Organisation of the Commissioner for Philately and Scripophily. For the same purpose, Soviet definitive issues of 1921 were also used.

Subsequently, similar tax stamps were issued by the government, via the Organisation of the Commissioner for Philately and Scripophily and the Soviet Philatelic Association, in 1925, 1928, 1931, and 1932.

History 
During the period of the New Economic Policy, the early Soviet government followed a policy of regarding stamp traders as just another type of the petit-bourgeois traders. They were allowed to operate by paying a tax, although some of them conducted affairs in the old way. Illegal trading was especially spread among the old specialists in the export bureau, and a few of them were even arrested and jailed.

In conformity with the new governmental policy, the practice of taxing philatelists engaged in international stamp trading was introduced across the whole country. Moscow, Kharkov, Tashkent, Tbilisi, Leningrad, Rostov-on-Don, Vladivostok, and Simferopol were served as points of arrival where the trading tax had to be paid. The revenues from international trading tax stamps were directed to various relief funds.

Members of the All-Union Society of Collectors (VOK) denounced those philatelists who did not comply with the new trading policy. For example, one of the editors stated in Sovetskii Kollektsioner:

In another article, a member advocated the VOK from blaming that it was "an organisation of private traders and consisted of speculators, disfranchised persons and similar elements which, of course do not merit the slightest trust."

In response, the author argued:

Using appropriately overprinted stamps, the philatelic tax system existed at least until 1940.

See also

References 

Philately of the Soviet Union
Postage stamps of the Soviet Union
Revenue stamps
Philatelic terminology
1922 introductions
Foreign trade of the Soviet Union
Taxation in the Soviet Union